The Christopher Rhodes House is an historic house at 25 Post Road in the Pawtuxet village of Warwick, Rhode Island.  The -story timber-frame house was built c. 1800 by Christopher Rhodes, a prominent local businessman and cofounder with his brothers of the Pawtuxet Bank.  The house was probably one of the finest Federal style homes of its time in the village, and is now one of the few to survive from that time.  It has a side-gable roof, and is five bays wide with a center entry.  The entry is topped by a fanlight and moulded architrave, and framed by Ionic pilasters.

The house was listed on the National Register of Historic Places in 1971.

See also
National Register of Historic Places listings in Kent County, Rhode Island

References

Houses completed in 1800
Houses on the National Register of Historic Places in Rhode Island
Houses in Warwick, Rhode Island
National Register of Historic Places in Kent County, Rhode Island
Historic district contributing properties in Rhode Island
Federal architecture in Rhode Island